Ewgenija Minevskaja (born 31 October 1992) is a German handball player for SCM Râmnicu Vâlcea and the German national team.

Personal life
Both of her parents were handball players. Her father, Andrej won the Olympic Games in 1992 with the Unified Team, while her mother, Svetlana had been even more successful, leading the Soviet Union's women's team to gold at the World Championships 1986 and 1990.

Individual awards
Bundesliga Top Scorer: 2014

References

External links

German female handball players
1992 births
Living people
Sportspeople from Minsk
Belarusian emigrants to Germany
Expatriate handball players
German expatriate sportspeople in France
German expatriate sportspeople in Romania
SCM Râmnicu Vâlcea (handball) players